Simon Harcourt (1653–1724), of the Middle Temple and Pendley, Hertfordshire, was an English politician.

Family
Harcourt was the son of Rev. Vere Harcourt and Lucy née Thornton. In 1677 he married his first wife Elizabeth, daughter of Sir Richard Anderson and Dame Elizabeth Anderson of Pendley Manor at Tring in Hertfordshire. Elizabeth died in 1694 and her parents were both dead by 1699, and Harcourt inherited the manor.

Harcourt remarried several times: Elizabeth née Canon (d. 1706), then Elizabeth née Morse (d. 1724), and finally Mary née Harcourt, the daughter of his cousin Sir Philip Harcourt.

Career
He was a Member (MP) of the Parliament of England and the Parliament of Great Britain for Aylesbury in the periods 21 December 1702 – 1705 and 1710–1715.

References

1653 births
1724 deaths
People from Hertfordshire
Members of the Middle Temple
English MPs 1702–1705
British MPs 1710–1713
British MPs 1713–1715
Members of the Parliament of Great Britain for English constituencies